Joe Martin (born between 1911 and 1913 – died after 1931) was a human-acculturated captive male orangutan who appeared in at least 50 American films of the silent era, including approximately 20 comedy shorts, several serials, two Tarzan movies, Rex Ingram's melodrama Black Orchid and its remake Trifling Women, the Max Linder feature comedy Seven Years Bad Luck, and the Irving Thalberg-produced Merry-Go-Round.

A celebrity of his day, Joe Martin dined with novelist Edgar Rice Burroughs and brawled with boxer Jim Jeffries. Upon entering adolescence, Joe Martin began to physically attack humans and other animals, including a night watchman, director Al Santell (possibly twice), a "hard-fried miner," a "villain," Tarzan, actor Dorothy Phillips, his trainer's wife, his trainer, a former trainer he despised, three unnamed assistant trainers, actor Edward Connelly, a small monkey, a circus trainer, and aerialist "Babe" Letourneau. At least three of these cases were also defenses of a woman, child, or animal. He staged major zoo escapes at least twice, once releasing the wolves and the elephant on the way out, and, separately, while evading recapture, relieving a police officer of his gun. 

By all accounts, Joe Martin could understand human expression, even "listening in on private conversations and performing stunts rejected for him by the trainer." Joe Martin also engaged, unprompted, in what humans would call improv. For example, he once kissed a gun "for luck" before entering into a movie shootout, and he responded to a visiting prelate's comment that a virtue of apes was their abstinence from alcohol by taking a flask out of his pants and offering the bishop a drink. 

In 1924, Universal deemed Joe Martin too dangerous to work in film and sold him to the Al G. Barnes Circus, where he remained until approximately 1931. Although the circumstances of his death remain obscure, Joe Martin had an unusually long lifespan for a captive orangutan of his era.

Background

Prior to 1924 there were no legal prohibitions against killing, capturing or selling orangutans. Thus, in the 19th and early 20th century, selling orangutans was a profitable business for an elaborate network of hunters, middlemen and dealers. Orangutan hunting and trapping has been illegal in Indonesia since 1931, but trading remained widespread until the mid-20th-century and provincial hunting and trading persists today.

However, according to zoologists, captive orangutan survival rates were dismal and lifespans short. (Death rates were high in part because members of the Pongo genus are highly susceptible to human-transmitted respiratory infections.) An estimated 60 percent of trafficked orangutans died in passage, and the majority of the survivors died within their first year in overseas captivity. Only 20 percent of 19th-century captive orangutans lived past age three. In the first decades of the 20th century it was still uncommon for orangutans to survive more than 18 months in captivity. Prior to the 1920s, the longest an orangutan had ever survived in captivity was six years; the mean lifespan for all captive orangutans was three-and-a-half years.

Meanwhile, in the United States, as one history of stunt performers and lion tamers put it: "Filmmakers were drawn to wild animals as a practical means of creating cinematic spectacle." Despite the obstacles to procuring orangutans and other wildlife, exotic animal dealers provided a steady supply of captured wild animals in response to a robust demand from wealthy private collectors, traveling circuses, roadside zoos, vaudeville shows, and the burgeoning international film industry.

In the early years of the 20th century, as the film industry moved west to Los Angeles, California, the city simultaneously became "the national center for wild animals and their trainers." Joe Martin, an orangutan, seemingly spent the better part of his life in two Los Angeles settlements—Universal City and Barnes City—that were established specifically to sell spectacle.

Biography

Transoceanic shipment and first owners

Joe Martin's origins are hazy but he was almost certainly captured wild in the Dutch East Indies. As with all primates, the mother-child dyad is foundational to infant survival, and young orangutans are heavily dependent on maternal care until at least age eight, "thus obtaining infants requires mothers to be killed in nearly all instances." Joe Martin's primary trainer told several reporters that the Universal orangutan could have been as young as five or six months old when he arrived. Various news stories from his years with Universal suggested he was born in years ranging from 1912 and 1914, and several, but not all, say he came from Borneo, homeland of the Bornean orangutan (Pongo pygmaeus). However, research into the history of primate trafficking has found that "while the orangutan was most closely associated with the island of Borneo, by the early 1900s a majority of orangutans on the global market were captured in, and exported from, northern Sumatra." Sumatra is the homeland of the surviving populations of Sumatran orangutans (Pongo abelii) and Tapanuli orangutans (Pongo tapanuliensis).

According to a somewhat detailed Camera! magazine report and a similar but longer article in the San Antonio Express newspaper, Joe Martin seemingly first arrived in the United States in 1911 at San Francisco via Singapore, in a "consignment of animals shipped by Frank Buck" to Robison of San Francisco. Behrendt set up the orangutan at the Venice Pier in an exhibit called The Missing Link, under the care of veteran animal trainer "Pop" Saunders, who had "trained hundreds of animals for the circus arena and for the movies." After a fire at the pier, Saunders apparently relocated with Joe Martin to Universal's "Old Ranch". At that time Universal was apparently leasing several animals from the Sells Floto Circus for a film, and someone had the idea that maybe the orangutan would add to the effect. Charles B. Murphy is said to have prepared the orangutan for his first picture, a one-reel comedy directed by Allen Turner, after which Universal bought Joe Martin from Behrendt for an undisclosed sum.

Another source says that Joe Martin's first American trainer was Red Gallagher. A third source, the posthumously published memoir of circus operator Alpheus George Barnes Stonehouse, states, "Joe Martin, the famous orang-utan movie star, was bought by my brother Jerry M. Barnes for the Universal Motion Picture Company. My brother started training him for the movies and his training was finished by Mr. Murphy, who worked for the Universal."

1915–1917: Breakout film and early work 

With one or possibly two exceptions, Joe Martin's short comedies are all believed to be lost films. As such, most of Joe Martin's film work (as well as much of silent movie history, generally) is known to film historians only through marketing materials, production stills, and media mentions. A portion of the Universal lot in the San Fernando Valley housed a wide array of performing animals; many silent-era animal scenes were shot in a central area of the Universal City Zoo called the arena. Joe Martin's breakout role was a two-reel short called Joe Martin Turns 'Em Loose "produced at the famous Universal City Zoo" and released in 1915. The film seems to have hinged on the comedy and excitement of opening all the animal cages at a zoo and sending a stampede of beasts after bystanding humans. Prior to the success of this film, Joe Martin was known as "Chimpanzee Charlie." 

Around 1915 an animal trainer named Curley Stecker started taking care of Joe Martin. According to Frank Buck (a valuable but not wholly reliable source), Joe Martin was cross-fostered by the Steckers: "He was taken into Curley's house to be raised...[and] grew up with the Stecker son." Curley is sometimes credited with "discovering" Joe Martin; man and orangutan worked as a team non-stop for the next eight years. As one magazine profile put it, "For Curley, he will do anything." Stecker's wife, small children, and nieces or nephews would sometimes appear alongside Joe Martin in films. The Stecker family rented a house across the road from the studio zoo, the zoo having been created in part as a "point of interest" at Universal City. The keepers were responsible for introducing the animals to visiting dignitaries such as Henry Ford. One such visit was made by Bishop Hanna of San Francisco in 1915. This event may be the occasion of a tale later told by one of Joe Martin's directors: "A famous old prelate came out to Universal City to see Joe. Joe listened while the old gentleman commented on the wonders of nature. 'You wouldn't catch a monkey taking a drink of vile liquor,' he observed. Joe reached in the hip pocket of his little pantaloons and came out with a pint of liquor, which he offered to the bishop with fine courtesy."

In the first three years of his career, Joe Martin appeared in at least 20 films, including Rex Ingram's vampy feature melodrama Black Orchids. (Five years later Joe Martin later played the same part in the retitled remake Trifling Women, which turned out to be one of his last on-screen credits.) According Universal's in-house magazine Moving Picture Weekly, young Joe Martin may have costarred with veteran performer Wallace Beery in one or more shorts called The Janitor, directed by Berry and released in 1916. The article about Beery's films noted that Joe Martin was "absolutely devoted" to zoo superintendent Rex De Rosselli and never let De Rosselli pass by without a hug. (Joe Martin wasn't so sure about Beery.) A news item about a Joe Martin one-reel directed by De Rosselli noted, "The simian seems to understand what his director tells him, and he is doing some wonderful work." 

A 1916 magazine feature on "Making Pictures in California" reported of the recently opened Universal zoo: "Here we find Joe, the chimpanzee, who sleeps in a regular brass bed, uses a toothpick after meals, etc." Joe Martin was taught to wear clothes and given a weekly shave, and seemed to enjoy the latter, although if the razor was dull, he was known to throw things at the barber. On the occasions when he was allowed roam the lot and was thirsty, he knew to put his thumb over the faucet spigot to direct the stream of water into his mouth. Joe Martin reportedly made a run for it across the Universal lot one day in the summer of 1917 but his child costar Lena Baskette readily lured him back to his enclosure. Meanwhile, human-interest blurbs about Joe Martin were being placed in regional newspapers: "Joe recently received a letter...reading as follows: 'Dear Joe Martin: I wish you would send me your picture. My papa says you are only a monkey, but I think you are an actor."

1918: Influenza epidemic, and night-watchman incident 

In November 1918, as the Spanish flu pandemic reached the west coast and Universal and other studios shut down for a month to prevent further spread, Joe Martin was infected with the virus but was "narrowly saved" from death by double pneumonia by the combined efforts of Dr. Richard Goodwin and Curley Stecker. A film magazine said that while he was ill, Joe Martin "wasted away to the form of a skeleton." Three years after the fact, a Boston paper reported that Joe Martin had "hovered between life and death" for nearly three weeks, but "all day, and frequently through the long nights of his illness, Stecker remained within the cage with him." Afterward Billboard magazine reported that "Joe Martin, the famous orang-outang at Universal, has been condemned to a 'flu' mask" in the hopes of reducing transmission to the other animals in the menagerie.

An example of Joe Martin's frequent work with child actors is found in a British distributor's description of Man and Beast, released this year: "The trade press were unanimous in proclaiming it the finest animal film extant. When you see that horribly ugly Orang Outang, 'Joe Martin,' advancing with his long waving arms towards little Baby Townsend and you shudder to think of the poor kiddie's fate, you will be surprised and delighted to see 'Joe Martin' sit down beside the tiny tot, and with his wicked-looking long arms, fondle the baby, who seems to be enjoying the experience as much as anybody." (This baby was likely played by Curley Stecker's two-year-old son Roy Stecker.)

Also in late 1918, a  lawsuit by Universal security guard Thomas G. Cockings was the first public allegation that Joe Martin had assaulted a human. Cockings claimed that Joe Martin had bitten him 40 times on the legs. The studio claimed at the Superior Court hearing that Joe Martin was "lovable," sharing photos of him walking with and embracing women, holding a baby, and wearing a flu mask, while one witness for the company testified that Joe Martin had hugged and kissed him at their first meeting. The outcome of the case was not publicized, but a couple of years later actor-director Al Santell told Photoplay, "There was a night watchman at the menagerie for a while who always carried a bottle with him on his rounds and now and then he'd give Joe a drink. But one night when he was three sheets to the wind he put red pepper in the whisky and oh boy! Joe nearly went crazy trying to get at the man...But he never hurts a woman or a child. When we use babies in the animal comedies they are absolutely safe with him."

1919: Escapes, and Al Santell incident
Business-wise, in 1919, when other film companies wanted to use him, Joe Martin's rental rate was said to be  a day. On the personal-life front, he had the frequent company of a small monkey called Skipper, and was said to "get along alright" with children, kittens, and lion cubs. An advertisement in a Canadian newspaper for Universal's two-reeler Jazz Monkey included a humorous essay about Joe Martin's diet; if taken as documentary, Joe Martin seemingly consumed a vegetarian diet of carrots, turnips, onions, corn on the ears, alligator pears, "root beer, ice-cream soda, coco-cola, or malted milk, to any extent a friend is able to buy," and "tobacco in moderation, preferring the smokeless variety." (A slightly later report said that Joe Martin's diet usually consisted of vegetables and a mixture of malted milk and warm water, sometimes supplemented with eggs "to give it more body and flavor." Sunday was a day of fasting for the zoo, followed by a richer meal than usual on Monday morning.) 

In June, Universal bought a full-page ad in Wid's Filmdom for an open letter to the industry. The letter, signed by Universal's founding mogul, Carl Laemmle himself, called Joe Martin "the only guaranteed star on the screen" and stated: 

A couple of months later, an in-house magazine advertisement for the Joe Martin franchise, written in the first-person Joe Martin point-of-view style of the "Joe Martin Soliloquizes" ad series, reported an anecdote from the filming of Jazz Monkey. In a scene where Joe Martin was due to confront the lion endangering the heroine, "I was afraid the gun wouldn't go off (property men are merely human) so I gave it an affectionate kiss just before I pulled the trigger and said in an offhand sort of way, 'Sweet baby don't fail me now!'...Well, sir, darn if the title writer didn't swipe the whole line, word for word, exactly as I said it...I wasn't even trying to be funny, yet they laughed."
In June 1919, Joe Martin attended a screening of his own film Monkey Stuff put on by the Los Angeles Evening Herald as an employment perk for its newsboys. Martin wore a Palm Beach suit, carried a cane, and responded animatedly to his own picture: "Joe must have thought it was good stuff he 'put over' on the screen, for he clapped his hands frequently and laughed monkey laughs whenever anything struck him as being particularly good. Late today Joe went out to the ball park to look over Coast League talent." Another article reported that Joe Martin looked back and forth between his hands and the screen several times before "he apparently came to the conclusion that it was himself he was looking at." Around the same time, an Ohio columnist reported that Joe Martin finger-combed his hair in the mornings, and turned the mirror to face the wall on bad hair days. The writer also made impressive primate cognition claims about Joe Martin: "The remarkable animal understands any spoken command, even listens in on private conversations and does stunts that were suggested for him but rejected by the trainer...His mental processes function without command from the trainer, an unusual trait. Upon leaving his cage he will carefully close the doors, slipping the hasp over its staple." On the topic of locks, keys, access control, orangutan containment, manual dexterity, and behavior modification, a much later report claimed, "He would pull a key ring out of his pocket, select the right key, and unlock his cage."

In July 1919, Joe Martin escaped from the zoo and went on a multi-day rampage in which time he wrecked an assistant trainer's quarters, released approximately 15 wolves, freed Charlie the Elephant, and created general havoc. Joe Martin then scaled the Universal barn and refused to come down off the roof for hours. His trainer placed food in his cage, but when Joe Martin finally came down, he made a point to rip the cage door off its hinges before entering so he could not be trapped while collecting his meal. After some time on the run, Joe Martin was found sleeping in the warm sand of a dry creek bed  from the studio. Curley Stecker was able to lasso him and return him to custody. Meanwhile, an Omaha, Nebraska newspaper entertainment columnist reported that Joe Martin escaped the arena, got to a main road and encountered an "honest-to-goodness evangelist preaching to his flock from a portable tabernacle on wheels." (This may have been during the escape described above.) Apparently Joe Martin had filmed a scene in a William S. Campbell comedy where he "broke up a church meeting" and so repeated the scene in real life. "After the worshippers had scattered and the minister was safe on top of a telephone pole," Joe Martin carried on with his day.

A July news item told a tale of Joe Martin protecting the weak from the strong. In this case, while on a William S. Campbell comedy, the scene called for a "hard-fried miner" to discipline a child by spanking. The scene choreography was such that the child was not actually hurt, "But it looked real to Joseph. His monkeyship had taken a fancy to the kiddie and it grieved him to see him paddled. Stepping down from his chair, Joe rushed the offending player. He grappled him around the ankles and tripped him up with a flying tackle that would have done wonders for a collegiate pigskinner. Having upset his victim, Joe stood over him, grinning evilly with long, barbed teeth and gathered the little kid to his hairy breast with his free arm. While the scene was being retaken, Joe was taken for an automobile ride."

The Los Angeles Times published advertorial photos of Joe Martin behind the wheel of a Kissel automobile and claimed that he had learned to drive. The content was created by Western Motor Company, Kissel distributors, and was designed to show that driving was easy. The paper also claimed that Joe Martin had recently ridden in an airplane piloted by a barnstormer contracted to Universal, Lt. Ormer Locklear.

In November 1919, Joe Martin attacked his director. In a Camera! column written by Harry Burns (who would himself later direct Joe Martin), it was reported that "Al Santell is nursing a badly lacerated hand and foot after having a none-too-friendly set-to with Joe Martin, the ourangoutang out at the Universal studio, where Al is directing the animal." As reported in 1920, Al Santell "remonstrated" with Joe about slamming a door too hard and breaking the set, so Joe Martin caught "him by the ankle...took him over and rolled him down the stairs." According to one newspaper report, in his fall down two flights of stairs, Santell suffered "a badly wrenched arm, a cut on the cheek, a sprained leg and numerous bruises. Joe Martin assured the director that it was merely a disciplinary measure and that there was no malice behind the act."

1920: Tarzan incident 
Joe Martin may have attacked Al Santell a second time, on the set of A Wild Night (1920). Santell recalled in a 1972 interview surfaced by film historian Steve Massa, "When a chimpanzee bites you, he doesn't just give you one quick bite—he clamps his teeth in, gets set, and then puts on the pressure. And I could feel each tooth mauling into my leg." It took the combined strength of Curley and Carl Stecker to detach the growing male orangutan from his director.

In March 1920, Popular Science published a photo feature on the animals of the Universal City Zoo, their trainers, and their film performances. Joe Martin and Curley Stecker made multiple appearances in the magazine spread; Charlie the Elephant and Ethel the Lioness were also photographed. The same month a Connecticut paper reported that Universal was building a "jungle bungalow" for Joe Martin with indoor plumbing and "period furniture." This building may have had a secondary purpose as a film set as there are mentions of a jungle bungalow in descriptions of A Monkey Movie Star, which was released the following year and was said to be Joe Martin's "autobiography." Another article mentioned that Joe Martin's "jungalow" included a bed, a sunken bathtub, a horizontal bar, and a trapeze. In March 1920, Universal Syndicate distributed the first of the racist Joe Martin comic strips, drawn by Forest McGinn, which were intended to establish the star orangutan as a multi-platform brand. 

Joe Martin was lent out by Universal for an opportunity to costar in an adventure film: The Revenge of Tarzan. Charlie the Elephant, another Universal City Zoo animal, was also credited as a performer in this movie. While doing publicity for the film in August, Gene Pollar, a "fresh face" hired for his New York firefighter's physique, reported that Joe Martin had attacked him on set. According to Pollar, "We were jumping...from bough to bough. I made a leap and, as my weight released it, a bough snapped back and hit Joe, standing ready to follow me, in the face. He thought I had done it on purpose...and the first thing I knew he was after me and on my back ready for fight. It took some effort to pull him off and it took triple the amount of effort and all the pastry in my lunch box to put him in friendly humor with me again."
In a December 1920 news article about ape-men performers that combined coverage of Joe Martin and Pat Walshe (human), there was another reported instance of what humans, with their endless propensity for anthropomorphism, called chivalry. While filming a scene in which Joe Martin's character was meant to assist the villain stealing from the heroine, Joe Martin entered the situation to find the villain looming over the lady: "[The villain] threatened. [The lady] trembled...with a growl that might be interpreted as 'You ain't done right by our Nell' Joe seized the villains with his long, powerful arms and pulled his legs from under him. The villain fell to the floor with a startled cry for help, and Stecker had to explain to the trained orangutan that the threatening attitude was all in the picture."

1921: Continuing in show business, Ethel Stecker incident
By 1921, newspaper listings for his films were noting, "Mr. Martin has had a longer career on the screen than any other real monkey." His owners reportedly had a  Lloyd's life insurance policy on Joe Martin, and he was said to receive monthly veterinary health assessments because he was so valuable. Joe Martin allegedly made  a week appearing in vaudeville and had spent the summer of 1920 with the Ringling circus "where he and Congo, a negro advertised as an African bushman, occupied a sideshow cage together."

During this period Curley Stecker reported that he sometimes climbed onto the roof of Joe Martin's cage and looked "down at him through the grating to see how he occupied his leisure moments. Unobserved, Joe acts with the same dignified decorum which characterizes his moments before the camera." Stecker reported that Joe Martin usually remained at the back of his cage unless someone passed by, and then he would come to the front and reach his hand out in greeting. Favored visitors were offered milk. Joe Martin exhibited annoyance by retreating to his bedroom and covering his head with a blanket. When he was "furiously enraged" he would swing on his monkey bars until "his pent-up feelings [had] been relieved." Stecker also disclosed that "novelist and naturalist" Edgar Rice Burroughs had invited Joe Martin to dinner. Stecker said, "We went by auto—Joe was dressed in a resplendent suit of green and black—from the arena to Mr. Burroughs' ranch. Joe was the first to alight and shook hands cordially with the naturalist. After a walk through the house we went to the dinner table. Joe will insist on tying his napkin around his neck, but aside from that slight breach of etiquette, everything went smoothly. What surprised Mr. Burroughs most was Joe knew immediately which knife and fork to use for each course."

Three juvenile orangutans, said from to have come from Borneo in crates stuffed with "jungle grass," joined the Universal City menagerie around March 1921. Two, called Jiggs and Kelly, had their own enclosure with a "heat plant" and wore "little pneumonia jackets of flannel Mrs. Stecker has made for them."

Stecker casually mentioned to a reporter that Joe Martin's "first rampage lasted a week, in which time he took a gun away from one of the policemen who was attempting to catch him and was about to kill the cop when the rest of us were able to seize him and truss him." According to another account of the incident (which is apparently distinct from the 1919 escape when he also freed Charlie the Elephant), the police officer had tried to shoot Joe Martin first. In June 1921, Joe Martin may have bitten Ethel Leona (Spurgin) Stecker while shooting A Monkey Bellhop, and had his canines removed or filed down as a consequence. According to a Lansing, Michigan newspaper report, after being startled or confused or hit with a telephone thrown by Curley Stecker, or all three, Joe Martin bit into Curley Stecker's wife's ankle "down to the bone." The legally prescribed consequence for an animal bite was supposed to be death for the animal, but Ethel Stecker pleaded for Joe Martin's life: "I brought him from a baby, I couldn't bear to part with him." Curley Stecker reportedly "appealed to authorities, promising to saw off his tusks if he would be spared." More to the point, Joe Martin was a lucrative profit center for the studio, much too valuable to be shot. It is unclear if any dental surgery took place but this was no doubt the kernel of a story about Joe Martin that appeared in silent-era child performer Diana Serra Cary's memoir some 75 years later. Joe Martin's second reported assault on a woman took place while he was on loan to First National in order to cling to a palm tree and provide jungle atmospherics for a caveman scene. Joe Martin apparently chucked a coconut right at actress Dorothy Phillips' head, and laughed about it afterward. Phillips was saved from injury by the density of her wig.

In October 1921, the Los Angeles Herald reported a scenario that sounded like a set-up for a law-school hypothetical involving the civil rights of primates: "Joe gets about a dozen letters a day from all over the world, most of his correspondents being under the impression that he is 'a little man dressed up like a monkey.' It is the reverse. He is a little monkey dressed up like a man, to more exact, a  orang-outang with a human brain. Inspector Cookson of the Los Angeles office of the postal inspectors is interested in determining Joe's rights to his own mail under the postal laws. Technically Joe is an animal. Actually he is an animal with a human brain and people write to him under perfectly good 2-cent stamps. Just to avoid any encounter with the federal grand jury Stecker has just instructed Joe Martin to open his own mail. It is a regular morning ceremony now at the Universal City arena." Apparently the heart of the issue was that sometimes fans sent money orders to pay for photos of Joe Martin, and if "Stecker should cash the money order on behalf of Universal it would take Edwin Loeb and a whole battery of famous corporation lawyers to keep him out of the clink." When handed a stack of envelopes from his mailbag, Joe Martin would usually pick the one with the "brightest hue" or the one with the most postage stamps; he then would hold it up to the light and rip off the end of the envelope, careful not to tear the enclosure.

In November 1921, as part of a studio-wide restructuring, Curley Stecker was removed as head of the Universal City Zoo.

1922: Killing of companion animal, Edward Connelly incident

In spring 1922, the writing seemed to be on the wall. The San Francisco Call reported that Joe Martin's film career was nearing an end: "Some think Joe Martin is incurably insane...when Joe showed signs of melancholia over Stecker's absence, a little monkey was placed in his cage in hopes that the companionship would stop his brooding. Joe beat the monkey to death against the bars." Joe Martin also attacked three substitute trainers during Stecker's absence. A March 1922 article described Stecker's return to the zoo after an "absence of several months." When Stecker reentered Joe Martin's cage for the first time, Joe Martin "sprang at Stecker and held his left wrist in a vise-like grip. He looked at Stecker's fingers. The little finger of the left hand is off at the knuckle. The animal, sure of his identification, threw hairy arms around Stecker's neck and kissed him."
 
Around the same time, a prolific magazine writer named Emma-Lindsay Squier published a book about animals subtitled Adventures in Captivity that included several chapters set in the world of the Universal Zoo. One chapter is entirely devoted to Joe Martin, whom Squier regarded highly. Squier, who had written at least three magazine features regarding or including Joe Martin, conveys that he adored his trainer "Pudgy" and despised his past trainer "Red Gallagher," who had once whipped him and burned him with a hot poker. In "Joe Martin, Gentleman!" Squier documented two additional assaults; she also witnessed Joe Martin defend a weaker animal from a bully, rescue an endangered human baby, and earn the respect of his sworn enemy.

During the filming of Trifling Women (1922), there was another altercation. Joe Martin played a sidekick of Barbara La Marr's character Zareda; Martin and La Marr apparently got along famously off-camera, to the point where Martin didn't react well when La Marr had scenes with her human male costars. Martin bit his costar Edward Connelly while they were shooting a scene where Connelly's character put a necklace around La Marr's neck. Emma-Lindsay Squier reported that he had been worked all day and "far into the night" and that "the nature of the scene was a constant tantalization to him" as it involved Edward Connelly taking away "a string of pearls given him in play by the heroine." A variant account of the incident was that Joe Martin was irritated at being refused a tumbler of water that Connelly was drinking, and that he almost knocked over La Marr to get to Connelly. A report in Photoplay stated that Stecker had told Connelly not to give Joe Martin the water because "he only drinks warm water and it's not good for him." Joe Martin waited until Stecker's back was turned to leap at Connelly; it took Stecker and "three property men" a full 10 minutes to get Joe Martin off Connelly. Joe Martin drew blood, possibly broke Connelly's arm and "mangled" his hand. Film editor Grant Whytock later recalled, "It took three of us twisting [Joe Martin's] balls to make him let go." During the Trifling Women incident Joe Martin apparently also bit Curley Stecker, "his trainer...who had been with him constantly since 1915." Stecker told Squier that even though he gave Joe Martin a "prompt and thorough beating after the unfortunate episode," Joe Martin accepted piggyback rides by the next day and did not seem to be holding a grudge. Cinematographer John F. Seitz used matte processing to finish the film's remaining scenes between Joe Martin's character Hatim-Tai and Connelly's Baron François de Maupin.

In December 1922, the New York Tribune ran a story on Curley Stecker's "Quadruped School of Dramatic Art" that disclosed that Stecker drove a seven-seat Pierce-Arrow automobile and let his cigarette hang from his bottom lip, a habit visible in photos of Joe Martin. Stecker addressed Joe Martin's mental health and changing behavior directly:

1923: The last picture show (maybe)

On April 23, 1923, while filming the genie-of-the-lamp movie The Brass Bottle, "during a parade sequence, veteran pachyderm-performer Charlie the Elephant, on loan from Universal, went berserk. As 300 extras scattered, Charlie turned on his trainer...picked him up and dashed him to the ground. As Charlie tried to kneel on Stecker to crush him, a stagehand struck the enraged elephant with a pitchfork, and the trainer was rescued." Stecker suffered lacerations, contusions, rib fractures, and a concussion. Charlie the Elephant was euthanized in autumn 1923. Stecker died the following year from leukemia, with "wild animal injury" listed as a complicating factor on his death certificate. At the time of Charlie's attack on Curley Stecker, Joe Martin was already "regarded as insane."

The studio wanted Joe Martin to appear in Merry-Go-Round (1923) but director Erich Von Stroheim refused to work with him. However, "boy wonder" producer Irving Thalberg fired Von Stroheim about a quarter of the way through filming for extravagance and general obstreperousness, and replaced him with Rupert Julian. The ape stayed in the picture. Per Massa, "Virtually all of the footage of Joe in the picture has him by himself...Joe is used very effectively, but it's obvious that Universal...strictly limited his interaction with other performers." The New York Times reviewer mentioned that the movie features a "great orang-outang—too big, but made to appear very real."

In November 1923, Charles B. Murphy replaced Curley Stecker as head animal trainer at Universal. As reporter Lorena Hickok put it: "With nobody the least bit enthusiastic about working with him, Joe's value to the movies dropped to minus zero." On December 31, 1923, Joe Martin was sold to the Al G. Barnes Circus. According to Camera! magazine, Universal studio chief Carl Laemmle "reluctantly" consented to the sale "on the circus man's assurance that the big ape would always have a proper home and good treatment." The deal was made by Harley Tyler, the Barnes Circus "fixer." In his memoir, Barnes said he paid . Apparently Ringling Brothers and other circuses had been offered the opportunity to buy Joe Martin but passed. A 1950 article for collectors of circus memorabilia asserted that Barnes bought Joe Martin as a counter to Ringling's acquisition of a western gorilla named John Daniel II. The studio magazine, Universal Weekly, reported that the sale was necessary because Joe Martin had "developed temperament and temper...a sudden savage sullenness which made it dangerous for any human actor to work with him...Two years ago Joe worked with children in comedies, and was as affectionate and well-behaved as a dog. He is as strong as four men, and so his sudden reversion to jungle savagery became a serious thing." Camera! reported, "Charles Murphy, the first man to put him in pictures, ushered him out of pictures, loading him into a cage on a circus truck, while actors at the big studio gathered to watch his departure and bid him farewell." According the San Antonio Express, Joe Martin had his head bowed as he was led out, on a leash, to a wagon waiting near the key-house of the zoo.

Joe Martin was at the studio for approximately a decade and for the most part remained in robust health, despite the historic fragility of captive orangutans. In addition to his bout with influenza, he apparently once stole a spiked bowl of punch from a banquet scene and was ill for the remainder of the day; a day of filming where he continuously smoked a cigar  made him similarly ill. Joe Martin also suffered "Klieg eyes," a reaction to the brightness of the sound-stage lights. He was spotted wearing an arm sling in 1919, supposedly because he fell off a roof and sprained his wrist. Joe Martin also suffered electrical burns to his hands in 1919 after he escaped a film shoot, climbed a power pole, chewed on the rubber insulation of the copper wires, and then began swinging along the lines as if he were in a forest canopy. Universal City  shut off the electricity, and assistant director Harry Burns climbed up the pole and rescued the "partially-paralyzed" animal.

1924–1927: Barnes Circus and Barnes City Zoo 

Early 20th century American circus animals were broadly divided into two groups: the performing or working animals, such as elephants that appeared in the center ring and also hauled equipment, and the menagerie animals that had a more passive role as a sideshow attraction. Joe Martin seems to have been a menagerie animal. According to Chang Reynolds, who published extensively about Barnes Circus in Bandwagon: The Journal of the Circus Historical Society, "This ape was billed by Barnes' show as monkey, chimpanzee, or gorilla, but seldom as an orang-utang which photos from those years prove he was." Summers were spent touring western North America by rail; winters were spent at the Barnes zoo in southern California.

In 1924, Joe Martin's first year with Barnes, George Emerson, who had previously been employed by Universal Zoo, was responsible for his care. The Billboard magazine column "Under the Marquee by Circus Cy" reported that Joe Martin was being billed as "the greatest movie star of them all" and that "Dr. Gunning, who attends him, says he is in the pink of condition." Lorena Hickok was less effusive about the circumstances in which Joe Martin found himself, describing him as a "broken and discouraged monkey...unwept, unhonored, unsung—and undressed—is Joe Martin in his narrow cage under the canvas out on the hot, dusty, old circus lot. Gone are his racetrack checks, his stovepipe hat, his watch charm...Sagging listlessly against the bars Friday afternoon, Joe sipped tepid water out of a milk bottle."

In 1925 a news report claimed that "no fewer than four persons were constantly engaged in looking after Joe's comfort." A later report clarified that Joe's comfort probably involved three men holding a -thick iron chain attached to a collar around his neck. A photograph of an orangutan with cheek pads baring his teeth at Al G. Barnes appeared in a March 1925 photo feature in the Los Angeles Times. Circa May 1925, Billboard reported that Joe Martin was the feature attraction of the Barnes menagerie and that a person named Joe Coleman was in charge of his "education." In June, in the presence of a group of reporters, Joe Martin dressed himself in a suit, struck a match, lit his own cigarette, and enjoyed a bottle of pop at the prompting of his trainer E.L. "Blacky" Lewis.

In January 1926, a reporter visiting the Barnes Zoo mentioned a "chimpanzee" named Joe Martin "trying to tear his cage apart." Joe Martin was still touring with Barnes during the summer circus season in 1926. A Chippewa Falls, Wisconsin newspaper reported that Joe Martin, with a guard and a chain around his neck, rode the afternoon circus parade route in a Willys-Knight sedan, and for the evening show switched to a Whippet sedan, both provided for the day by a local car dealer. Joe Martin wore a black suit and a plug hat for the parade and "he doffed this hat courteously to the crowds."

Joe Martin briefly escaped during a 1927 circus stand in San Rafael, California. To the shock of the assembled crowd, he initially charged a group of stake drivers, but then, "in his ape-like slouching amble," changed direction and seized trapeze artist Babette Letourneau by the arms. Letourneau reportedly screamed and fainted. Former heavyweight champion James J. Jeffries was on the scene because he and another heavyweight boxer, Tom Sharkey, were doing an exhibition match as part of the show. As witnessed by an alleged 400 members of the circus troupe, Jeffries ran at Joe Martin bellowing "Let go there—" which led Joe Martin to drop LeTourneau. Jeffries then swung at Joe Martin with his right but missed and lost his balance, at which point Joe Martin jumped on his back, holding on with his hind feet. Jeffries then threw himself backwards to the ground, hard enough to knock the wind out of Joe Martin. Jeffries got back up, and Joe Martin did too, but, in the words of the sports-page writer, “this time Jeffries in his famous crouch was ready." Jeffries knocked down Joe Martin with a punch, and then clambered on top of him and beat him unconscious. The orangutan was returned to his circus wagon, and was largely uninjured "except for a cut and swollen eye...He is not so lively, however, and seems to be brooding."

1928–1931: Last reports
The Barnes City zoo closed in 1927 and winter quarters were relocated further inland to Baldwin Park. New language in Barnes advance ads of summer 1928 asserted that Joe Martin was "the most valuable zoological specimen in captivity today." On January 5, 1929, Barnes sold his operation to American Circus Corporation. Just eight short months later, in September 1929, as Wall Street was on the precipice of the Great Crash, American Circus turned around and sold Barnes and four other traveling circus brands to Ringling. The combination of the debt-financed purchase and the post-crash collapse in ticket revenue was devastating for the circus business generally and John T. Ringling's fortune specifically. The impresario of the west, Al G. Barnes, died of pneumonia in July 1931. (The Barnes brand continued to tour the country by railroad until 1938 when it was subsumed into Ringling once and for all.)

Joe Martin resurfaced briefly in 1931 in a Time magazine film column: "Universal's menagerie of 40 animals includes a 52-year-old alligator named Little Joe...procured from a bankrupt Florida circus...incarcerated at Universal City ever since it was built, 17 years ago. Also from a Florida circus came Chimpanzee Joe Martin. Innocent, obedient, clever, Joe Martin performed in Tarzan pictures, was sold back to a circus seven years ago when he became unmanageable, began to annoy other Universal monkeys. He may be repurchased to act in The Murders in the Rue Morgue." Ultimately, the part of the orangutan from Poe's original story went to two ape-costumed humans and, for close-ups, a chimpanzee from the Selig Zoo.

In 1935, an Idaho publisher printed Al Barnes' memoirs, as told to author Dave Robeson while Barnes was dying in the desert city of Indio, California.

Barnes also tells of a rampage that ended in Joe Martin being punched out by a boxer, and of Joe Martin getting tangled in his own clothes while having an outburst. The book's illustrations 360 and 361 are photos of Joe Martin (orangutan) in his circus-wagon cage, alternately shaking hands with Al Barnes and "alone, in a pensive mood." There is a surviving poster in the Tibbals Circus Collection of the Ringling Museum for a Giant Gorilla Man: The Largest Specimen of its Kind in All the World featuring "Joe Martin (himself)."

Given the Time report, 1931 is a conservative estimated year of death for Joe Martin. Joe Martin's estimated birthyear predates by five years the earliest historical record in the International Orangutan Studbook, but even with a most-conservative birth year of 1914 and most-conservative death year of 1927, Joe Martin may well have been one of the longest-lived orangutans in overseas captivity in the era that closed with the advent of modern recordkeeping.

Filmography

Joe Martin had reportedly appeared in over 100 movies by the end of 1919. Joe Martin and the other animals of the Universal City Zoo were used in tropical adventure movies, historical epics, circus pictures, or simply to add a gothic element to melodramas or horror films.

According to "noted animal director" Campbell, two-reel comedy shorts with humans could be shot in eight to 10 days, while animal comedies took upwards of a month. Campbell used live chamber music, played within hearing but out of sight his ape performers in order to elicit appropriate facial expressions during emotional scenes. According to the primary history of Century Comedies, William S. Campbell's shorts were likely the apogee of Joe Martin-centric comedic scenarios, resulting in a decline in quality, exhibitor reception, and revenue after Campbell left Universal to become an independent producer. Nonetheless, Campbell's assistant director Harry Burns carried on the Joe Martin franchise for two more years, generating six more titles, apparently in close cooperation with Curley Stecker.

"Joe Martin monkey picture" seems to have been such a marketing hook that a spinoff series was launched featuring Mrs. Joe Martin (chimpanzee), although Joe Martin himself seemingly appeared in none or just one. Per Massa, "It seems likely that the creation of the 'missus' was a way for the studio to insure a regular release schedule of monkey comedies as big money maker Joe Martin was getting more difficult to work with."

Gallery

Credits

 Title unknown, one-reel comedy directed by Allen Turner
 Universal Ike Makes a Monkey of Himself (1914)
 Mike and Jake Live Close to Nature (1914)
 What Happened to Schultz? (1914)
 Actors from the Jungle (1915), Powers, one reel, Joe Martin credit as "Chimpanzee Charlie, the most accomplished Simian actor in the world"
 When Brains Are Needed (1915), Big U, "...when the orang-outang escapes..."
 The Black Box (1915), 15-episode serial directed by Otis Turner
 Joe Martin Turns 'Em Loose (1915), two reels, comedy, directed by Rex De Rosselli and Paul Bourgeois
  (1915), "a spoof of cliff-hanger serials in eleven one-reel chapters," directed by Allen Curtis, PARTIALLY EXTANT. (Joe Martin appears in extant episodes four, "Baffles Aids Cupid," and nine, "When the Wets Went Dry.")
 The Janitor (1916), directed by Wallace Beery 
 The Missing Link, or What Darwin Missed (1916), one-reel, directed by Beverly Griffith
 Hungry Happy's Dream (1916), directed by Guy Hedlund, working title H. Oboe Rhodes, Animal King
 A Strange Confession (1916), a 101 Bison-Jay Hunt production, mystery drama
  After Midnight (1916), one-reel comedy, directed by Rex De Rosselli
  In African Wilds (1917), directed by Henry McRae
 The Red Ace (1917), a 16-episode serial
 Man and Beast (1917), five-reel feature, directed by Henry McRae, costarring "baby Stecker" and Charlie the elephant POSSIBLY EXTANT (MoMA)
 Amelita's Friend (1917), two reels, one of the "Lena Baskette Featurettes," directed by Marshall Stedman
 Black Orchids (1917), feature melodrama, directed by Rex Ingram
 Making Monkey Business (1917), Victor comedy, one reel, directed by Allen Curtis
 The Lure of the Circus (1917), Bison two-reel comedy, directed by Henry McRae, alternate title The Life of the Circus
 The Fatal Marriage (1918), Fox-Lehrman-Sunshine, directed by Henry Lehrman
 The Lion's Claws (1918), adventure serial, episode 14 "Hell Let Loose"
 Jazz Monkey (1919), two-reel comedy, directed by William S. Campbell, working title was And the Elephant Still Pursued Her
 Monkey Stuff (1919), two-reel comedy, directed by William S. Campbell POSSIBLY EXTANT (BFI)
  Looney Lions and Monkey Business (1919), two-reel comedy, produced by Vin Moore, costarring "the Century Lions"
 It's a Bird (1919), L-KO, comedy
 The Merry-Go-Round (1919), Fox Film Co.
 Photoplay Magazine Screen Supplement, Issue 5: Roughhouse at the Universal Zoo (1919), newsreel
 The Return of Tarzan aka The Revenge of Tarzan (1920), Numa Pictures feature, directed by Harry Revier
 Upper Three and Lower Four (1920), five-reel comedy feature, directed by Al Santell
 The Evil Eye (1920), horror serial starring boxer Benny Leonard
  King of the Circus (1920), thriller serial, directed by J.P. McGowan
 A Prohibition Monkey (1920), two-reel comedy, directed by William S. Campbell 
 A Wild Night (1920), two-reel comedy, directed by Al Santell
 Screen Snapshots 1-11 (1920)
 His Day of Rest (1920), one reel, adventure comedy
 A Monkey Bell Hop (1921), Universal Jewel, two-reel comedy, directed by Harry Burns
 A Monkey Hero (1921), two-reel comedy, directed by Harry Burns, working title A Monkey Fireman
 A Monkey Movie Star (1921), two-reel comedy, directed by Harry Burns — Shot at the Universal City arena, said to be Joe Martin's "autobiography" and "show the simian star as he actually is, both before the camera and in the seclusion of his  jungle bungalow." — "The picture shows the mode of life and the training of the famous orang-outang."
 No Monkey Business (1921), one or two reels, directed by Al Russell 
 His Lady Friend (1921), two reels, directed by Vin Moore
 Seven Years Bad Luck (1921), feature comedy with an extended sequence filmed at the Universal City Zoo; said to be Max Linder's best surviving film FILM EXTANT
 The Adventures of Tarzan (1921), a 15-episode serial FILM EXTANT
 Screen Snapshots 1-17 (1921), newsreel
 Ready to Serve (1921), comedy starring Chester Conklin
 A Monkey Schoolmaster (1922), two-reel comedy, directed by Harry Burns
 Trifling Women (1922), feature melodrama
 The Adventures of Robinson Crusoe (1922)
 Merry-Go-Round (1923), romantic drama feature; producing prodigy Irving Thalberg oversaw the film FILM EXTANT
 Hollywood (1923), Famous Players-Lasky, newsreel
 Down in Jungle Town (1924), one-reel comedy, directed by Harry Burns and Curley Stecker
 A White Wing Monkey (1924), one or two reel comedy, directed by Harry Burns and Curley Stecker
 Life in Hollywood (1927), newsreel FILM EXTANT

See also
 Orangutans in popular culture
 List of individual apes
 List of animals in film and television
 List of Universal Pictures films (1912–1919) and (1920–1929)
 List of film and television accidents
 List of largest non-human primates
 The Playhouse (1921), a comedy short in which Buster Keaton's character steps in for an escaped vaudeville orangutan
 The Chimp (1932), a Laurel and Hardy short about circus and film apes

Explanatory footnotes

References

Further reading

External links 
 
 
 Joe Martin at ECHO
 Lafayette College Library via Internet Archive: Who Gives a Chimp a Cigar?!: Using Library Services to Track Down Sources and Will the Real Joe Martin Please Stand Up?

Universal City Zoo
Individual orangutans
Individual primates in the United States
Martin, Joe
Animal actors
Male mammals
Circus apes
Primate attacks
Year of birth unknown
Year of death unknown
1910s animal births
1930s animal deaths